Northern Private University is a private university located in Trujillo, Peru. It was established by the Peruvian Congress Law N° 26275, on November the 5th, 1993. The academic activities in the University began on August the 15th, 1994. The Northern Private University has four campuses in Trujillo and Cajamarca  and Lima respectively. Today, the University has about 10,000 students enrolled in undergraduate study programs, along with the undergraduate programs, the Northern Private University offers postgraduate programs as well. Since September 15, 2007, it has become a member of Laureate International Universities.

External links
UPN Website (Spanish)
UPN Laureate International Universities website

Educational institutions established in 1993
Universities in Trujillo, Peru
1993 establishments in Peru